WRPP (92.7 FM) is a radio station broadcasting a classic rock format, simulcasting WRUP 98.3 FM Palmer, Michigan. Licensed to Manistique, Michigan, it first began broadcasting in 2004. WRPP's transmitter is located off of County Road 442 just north of the town of Cooks, Michigan in the southwestern corner of Schoolcraft County. The station transmits its signal from an antenna 772 feet high with an effective radiated power of 24,500 watts and can be heard from St. Ignace all the way to Escanaba and Marquette in Michigan's Upper Peninsula.

WPIQ first began broadcasting in 2004 under the frequency of 99.9 FM. In November 2007, the frequency was changed to 92.7 FM. In 2010 the station raised its power, enabling it to be heard over much more of the Upper Peninsula and across the lake in northern Lower Michigan.

In June 2013, after changing its call sign from WPIQ to WRPP, the station changed format from talk to classic rock, simulcasting WRUP 98.3 FM Palmer, Michigan.  Programming is derived from Cumulus Media's The Classic Rock Experience format.  WRUP serves the Marquette area while WRPP provides a strong signal to the Escanaba area.

Previous logo

References

External links

Michiguide.com = WPIQ History

RPP
Radio stations established in 2004